Odrowąż  is a village in the administrative district of Gmina Witkowo, within Gniezno County, Greater Poland Voivodeship, in west-central Poland.

See also 

 Odrowąż coat of arms

References

Villages in Gniezno County